John J. McGlone (born 1955) is an American animal scientist and a Frank Guggenheim Fellow, Institutional Official Director and professor of Animal Science at Texas Tech University.

Early life and education 

McGlone grew up in the New York City area and on Long Island, New York. He graduated from Holy Family High School in Huntington, NY. He received his B.S. and his M.S. in 1977 and in 1979 in Animal Science with a minor in Neuroscience at Washington State University. He completed his Ph.D. in 1981 in Animal Science with a minor in Neural and Behavioral Biology from University of Illinois. He was a research professor in animal science at University of Wyoming before moving to Texas Tech University.

Research and academic contributions 

McGlone is known for his research and contributions in (a) the use of pheromones to alter farm animal and companion animal behavior, (b) the welfare of transport in pigs, (c) housing and care of sows (adult pigs), and (d) sustainable pork production systems.

McGlone has published over 150 original refereed publications including papers, book chapters, abstracts and technical reports. He has been invited to speak in the USA, Europe, Latin America, Asia, and Australia on animal behavior, welfare, and management.  He is frequently quoted in the news as an expert on farm animal behaviour.

McGlone has been granted more than $4.8 million research funding. He started a company, Farm Animal Care Training and Auditing, which was sold to Frost in 2012.

Honors and awards 

 1992: ASAS Animal Management Award
 2010: Chair of Federation of Animal Science Societies (FASS) Animal Care and Use Committee
 1990: Presidential Academic Achievement Award at TTU
 1992: Outstanding Researcher at College of Agricultural Science at TTU
 1983 and 1984: Harry Frank Guggenheim Research Fellowship Award

Books 

John J. McGlone co-authored a book with Pond, Wilson G titled Pig Production: Biological Principles and Applications. This book is widely used as a textbook.

References

External links 
 John J. McGlone page at website of laboratory of animal behavior, physiology and welfare at TTU
Production: Biological Principles and Applications, .
 List of notable graduates from his laboratory
 Farm Animal Care Training and Auditing
Lubbock Avalanche-Journal, Agriculture briefly, 11/10/2003.
ASAS Animal Management Award, Journal of Animal Science, 2002.

Texas Tech University faculty
Scientists from New Rochelle, New York
1955 births
21st-century American zoologists
University of Illinois College of Agriculture, Consumer, and Environmental Sciences alumni
Living people